Lord Havelock Vetinari, Lord Patrician (Primus inter pares) of the city-state of Ankh-Morpork, is a fictional character in Terry Pratchett's Discworld series. Vetinari has written an unpublished manuscript known as The Servant, the Discworld version of The Prince by  the Italian statesman and diplomat Niccolò Machiavelli.

Fictional biography

Early years 
Lord Vetinari was born into the extremely powerful Vetinari family (a pun on the real-life family of the Medici and on the word "veterinary") and raised by his aunt, Lady Roberta Meserole.

As a youth, he enrolled in the Assassins' Guild which, apart from teaching its students how to kill other people for money, also gives them an excellent academic education. Lord Vetinari was particularly interested in the classical arts and, in flagrant defiance of the Guild's conventions of style, camouflage, though he failed his stealth examination (due to the examiner's belief that he had never attended any of his classes). However, Lord Vetinari claimed that he religiously attended his classes, pointing out that in a class on an inherently discreet occupation, he was the only student that wasn't visibly present.  Because of the similarity his name bore to "veterinary", he endured the nickname of Dog-botherer (cf. god-botherer). Vetinari graduated from the Guild with exceptional marks, scoring disconcertingly high in attention to detail. It is also mentioned that he studied languages; in Jingo he translates Klatchian for Sergeant Colon, although he flatly denies being able to speak it.

In his late teens, Vetinari was involved in the "Glorious 25th of May" (Night Watch), to which his most notable contribution was the non-assassination of the then-Patrician of Ankh-Morpork, Homicidal Lord Winder, at a crowded party. Vetinari was present at Winder's death, but although he certainly intended to assassinate Winder, his mere arrival was enough to frighten Winder to death. Vetinari was able to drop his bloodless sword beside Winder's corpse, unused, and leave – all seemingly unobserved by anyone in the room, save Winder (though it was hinted that the party was arranged for the very purpose of facilitating the occasion of Winder's assassination). Vetinari appeared in full Assassin regalia, which Winder regarded as something out of a nightmare. When asked (as was traditional) about who he is and who sent him, he replies, respectively, 'Think of me as...your future' and 'I come from the city' showing that he already has the concern for the city's welfare he later shows.

Later, he fought alongside the remnants of the Night Watch commanded, for want of better, by Sergeant-at-Arms Samuel Vimes (then going by the name "John Keel", having to serve as mentor to his younger self was already serving as a probationary Constable, as the real John Keel had been murdered by Carcer Dunn, a murderer that Vimes had been pursuing) against the remnants of the Cable Street Particulars (colloquially known as the Unmentionables), the late Lord Winder's secret police. The effect "Keel" has on Vetinari and the events of 25 May clearly shape Vetinari's views on the effective way of running the city (which had helped shape Vimes').

Vetinari later journeyed to Überwald on what is known as the Grand Sneer (a parody of Grand Tour); travels of the younger members of rich families to backward areas to see at first hand how inferior they are. There he met the vampire Lady Margolotta. It is implied that the two had some kind of relationship, and stated more clearly that he taught her a lot of what she knows, and vice versa. It was also there that he learnt about the nature of evil after witnessing a mother otter and its pups feeding on a salmon and its roes (Unseen Academicals).

Rise to power 
Lord Vetinari succeeded Mad Lord Snapcase, who had been as mad as the name suggests. One of Vetinari's earliest actions and a sample of his way of running the city was to legalize Guilds such as those of the Thieves and the "Seamstresses", which had been active-but-outlawed for years. Their leaders became esteemed members of society and their members insured and licensed. Vetinari also made it clear to them that he knew everything about them, right down to where their wives had their hair done, and where their children played. Therefore, the Guilds did what he asked of them, and eventually, crime was not so much 'eliminated' as organized. Nowadays, for a modest fee, an Ankh-Morpork citizen may walk the streets confident that he will not be mugged more than a few times per year, and will always receive a receipt.

Vetinari's golden rule 
Lord Vetinari's political philosophy can be summed up by his belief that what people wish for most is not good government, or even justice, but merely for things to stay the same; the Vetinari family motto is, after all, Si non confectus, non reficiat ("If it ain't broke, don't fix it"). This does not mean that there are absolutely no changes; however, things that don't work are fixed very quickly, even if it does not look like they are at first. In Soul Music, Mr. Clete expresses a belief that "things that didn't work ... got broken". Perhaps in conjunction with this, Vetinari has an interest in keeping things in smooth, simple working order. For example, Vetinari still maintains an ancient department of the Ankh-Morpork government responsible for ensuring all figures of speech have a basis in fact, on the basis that people who seek this kind of employment must be kept busy, or else they just might do anything.

Despite being technically a dictator, Lord Vetinari does not exercise the despotic rule that characterised some of his predecessors. Vetinari is the archetype of a benevolent dictator, in a chilly, inscrutable way. In The Truth, he permits the emergence of a free press, and has rarely, if ever, been known to have innocent people just dragged off to dungeons without a trial: The notable exception to this rule are mime artists, whom Vetinari despises. Vetinari banned all mime performances from Ankh-Morpork shortly after taking power. Mime artists who violate the ban usually find themselves hanging upside down in Vetinari's scorpion pit while reading a sign saying, "Learn the Words". This tyrannical 'quirk' has been met with either indifference or approval by average Ankh-Morpork citizens.

Morporkians are in no doubt that Vetinari is firmly in charge of the city; the political system of Ankh-Morpork is described as "One Man, One Vote," in which Vetinari alone is the Man, and he has the Vote. In Going Postal, while Vetinari could have ordered an investigation of the Grand Trunk company and their financial endeavours at any time, he did not do so until public opinion allowed it, and only then did he proclaim his right as a "tyrant" to launch such an inquiry. Also, in Making Money, he first appears to avoid meddling in the affairs of private business, but suddenly exercises his executive power in closing several prominent banks for audit at the end of the novel.  Vetinari is broadly tolerant of individual rights, but highly intolerant of people who place their own interests above those of the city.  Beyond this, he arranges for useful but problematical people to "vanish" in one fashion or another. Leonard of Quirm (the Discworld's Leonardo da Vinci) "vanished" and spends his time in an airy attic of the palace, quite happy to continue to invent in solitude and occasionally assisting when the City requires his genius (e.g. during the events of Jingo and The Last Hero). He also recruits condemned criminals with useful skills and traits, arranging for their hanging by an expert hangman who knows exactly how much rope to give a man for them to survive and be enlisted for the good of the city. These are generally offered the choice to work for the city using their unique skills or the "Freedom to take the Consequences". In Going Postal, both Moist von Lipwig and Reacher Gilt were offered the chance to work for the city, but while von Lipwig accepted and was tasked with resurrecting the Postal Service, Reacher Gilt decided to choose the "freedom" of a door which turned out, when chosen, to open into a deep pit. In Making Money, Vetinari similarly enlists the services of a remarkably skilled forger Owlswick Jenkins in the designing of unforgeable banknotes, although this was complicated when von Lipwig broke Jenkins out of prison for the same purpose.

Staying in power 
While he is just as unpopular as those that came before him, Lord Vetinari is very much sane, of sound mind and judgment, and very much still alive. He has achieved this by ensuring that even though all power-wielding groups in the city dislike him, they dislike each other even more. He also carefully arranges matters so that a reality which includes him as Patrician is slightly better than one which does not, with the result being that there are only two people who may potentially benefit from his death: Carrot Ironfoundersson and Samuel Vimes who are claimants to the extant throne of Ankh along with their associates, on the grounds that they would be 'on top of the pile' if the city collapsed, as the city's rightful heir to the throne and the highest ranking noble respectively. Carrot Ironfoundersson and Samuel Vimes are the captain and commander of the City Watch, and hence are opposed to any kind of coup as part of their dedication to the rule of law. Ironfoundersson is noted by Vimes to be one of the few people who actually likes the Patrician, and Vimes, while adamant that he doesn't, shares the dedication to the city felt by Vetinari and Ironfoundersson. The Assassins' Guild no longer accepts contracts on the Patrician – he is the only person besides Samuel Vimes to have been taken off the register. He had the highest "official" price for a living being ever: 1 Million Ankh-Morpork Dollars" (Men at Arms).

In Thud!, his rule of the city is likened to a room full of tension, with people bickering and shouting at one another, and "in the middle of it all, one man, quietly doing his own thing".

Other reasons for the Patrician's continued rule include his mastery of diplomacy and manipulation, his distant and menacing air, his ever-present calmness and composure (which, ironically, make other people ill at ease), and his skills as an Assassin; in The Truth, another character relates that "Vetinari moved like a snake".

Additionally, Vetinari organizes grassroots resistance to himself, enabling him to ensure that all plots against him fail, and that the various groups are constantly quarrelling with each other.

Vetinari has created (or at least continued, though he denies it) the use of a team of clerks, sometimes called the 'Dark Clerks', who bring him information on just about everything; they serve, among other functions, as accountants, forensic auditors, and a domestic intelligence service.

Vetinari's rule over the city seems to be cemented by the general acknowledgement that very little goes on in the city that Vetinari does not know about. Thus, when a visitor stands in audience with the Patrician, they can be assured that Vetinari knows exactly why they're there, even if the visitor does not.

Deposition and restoration 
Several attempts have been made on Vetinari's life or position; strangely enough, he seems to be involved in most of them. Shortly after his ascent to office, he was briefly turned into a lizard by a wizard under the influence of a Sourcerer. He was deposed for a time in favour of a pretender king and subsequently a summoned dragon (Guards! Guards!) and locked up in his own dungeons from which he is able to escape at his leisure.

As seen by Vimes, the door to his cell is very large and heavy, and is absolutely covered in bars, bolts and locks – on the inside. All that is found on the outside is a single lock, a key to which Vetinari had hidden in the cell. He has two mottos a ruler should remember when building dungeons:  "Never build a dungeon you wouldn't want to spend the night in yourself", and, "Never build a dungeon you can't get out of".

The collection of sentient, loyal rats with access to the dungeons, and much of the palace itself, provides a well-secured backup escape plan; during a conflict with the palace's snake and scorpion populations Vetinari provided them with military advice, allowing them to become the palace's dominant vermin.

He is shot in the leg with a gonne and walks with an ebony cane (Men at Arms). It is rumoured that the cane held a sword that was made of iron from the blood of a thousand men, but this is revealed to be false (Making Money); as he says to Moist; "Oh, really. Do I look like a 'sword made of the blood of a thousand men' ruler?"

A year after the events of Men at Arms, he is poisoned with arsenic, which he inhales from the smoke of poisoned candles (Feet of Clay). Characteristically, he had caught-on to the ploy, but continued to fake both the symptoms and the evidence of it until the City Watch found out, cutting up the candle to give the impression that it had been burning all night, thus exposing the conspiracy behind the method.

During the brief war with Klatch, Vetinari unexpectedly surrenders unconditionally to martial law. When the island which is both the cause of controversy and the location set for the signing of the surrender treaty sinks into the ocean (again), all the terms of surrender are called off and the Klatchian leader loses face (and his throne), which was Vetinari's plan all along. He ends up being congratulated instead of being deposed and exiled (Jingo).

Some time later, Vetinari is framed for assault (on Drumknott) and theft from the city treasury. Again, he comes a hair's breadth from being deposed (The Truth). He is 'arrested' by his own Commander of the Watch (Samuel Vimes) for attempted murder, and spends part of the book incarcerated (although it is implied that this was done to keep Vetinari safe until the ultimate culprit was found, Commander Vimes suspecting something suspicious about the entire scenario), feigning unconsciousness throughout the main events, only to 'come to' once the mystery was solved. William de Worde works out that it was a plot using a body double for Vetinari. He first becomes suspicious when it occurs to him that if Vetinari had wanted Drumknott dead, Drumknott would undoubtedly be dead.

There have also been numerous attempts on his life by assassins retained by other parties; the universal failure of these attempts (as well as the insight that the city ruled by him is slightly better than it is without him) leads to the Assassins Guild's refusal to accept further contracts on Vetinari (Night Watch).

Notable events during Vetinari's rule 
Vetinari has seen Ankh-Morpork through many unusual events, including the appearance of a Sourcerer (Sourcery), a dragon (Guards! Guards!), a near-civil war (Men at Arms), plus one actual war (Jingo) and an attempt to destroy the Discworld (The Last Hero), as well as the metaphysical crises of Moving Pictures, Music With Rocks In (Soul Music), superfluous life force and belief (Reaper Man, Hogfather), and one major temporal shatter (Thief of Time). It is unclear whether even the well-informed Vetinari was aware of the last.

Vetinari has encouraged the growth of the Guilds and public services. The Ankh-Morpork City Watch in particular has flourished, and is an excellent example of the adaptability which has kept Vetinari in office. At the time he rises to power, the Night Watch consists of three incompetents led by a drunk, just how he then wanted it (incapable of fighting crime, which was being efficiently controlled by the government-approved Thieves and Assassins Guilds). The group evolves into a large, efficient, well-oiled machine that facilitates the smooth operation of the city, and that appears to be just how he wants it. It is observed to him on one occasion that if Vimes (and presumably Vimes' Guards) did not exist, he would have had to invent him; to which he responds "You know, ... I rather think I did" (Feet of Clay).

Ankh-Morpork has given birth to the first newspaper, the Ankh-Morpork Times (The Truth), while the Grand Trunk Clacks Company established the first efficient international communication service from its headquarters there (The Fifth Elephant).

More recently, he has put into place Moist von Lipwig, who revamps the postal service without costing the taxpayers anything (Going Postal). During this, he invents stamps, which are the closest thing Ankh-Morpork had to banknotes until said form of currency makes its debut in Making Money (again by von Lipwig).

At some point between Thud! and Making Money, Vetinari begins planning for a phenomenal redevelopment project of Ankh Morpork titled 'The Undertaking' – this seems to have been inspired by the discovery in Thud! of an ancient perpetual motion engine – a twin of one which according to Carrot Ironfoundersson powers all of the machinery in one of the largest mines in Uberwald. Rumours around the Undertaking include mention of 'underground streets', 'waterproof tunnels' and 'new docks'.

Appearance, habits and miscellaneous 

Currently in his late forties/early fifties (Sam Vimes noted in  Feet of Clay that the Patrician was about the same age as he was, and it is shown in  Night Watch that he was a licensed student Assassin, making him 17 at the time of the main events of the book, when Vimes was 16), Lord Vetinari is tall, thin and dresses all in dusty black, including a black skullcap. In Reaper Man, Mustrum Ridcully likens his appearance to a predatory flamingo, if one existed.

His family coat of arms is a plain, simple sable shield, and therefore does not show up against the black coach in which Vetinari travels – black on black (upon which Moist von Lipwig in Going Postal comments that "you had to admit that the bastard had style").  His family motto is Si non confectus, non reficiat (If it ain't broke, don't fix it).

Lord Vetinari lives and works in the Patrician's Palace, which used to be the Royal Winter Palace. He sits on a plain wooden chair at the feet of the Golden Throne of Ankh (much like the Steward of Gondor in The Lord of the Rings). The Throne remains untouched despite being allegedly made of gold, but Vetinari reveals to Captain Carrot that it is actually merely gold foil over rotten-through wood.

He accepts interviews in the Oblong Office (a reference to the White House's Oval Office). Notably he does not request, or even demand the presence of any of his citizens, but merely has them informed that they "have an appointment with him", and they are promptly escorted to said appointment. When Vetinari considers the meeting ended, he usually dismisses his visitors with the phrase "don't let me detain you", the inherent implication being that he just might if they let him.

He holds meetings in the Rats Chamber, so named because of its fresco of dancing rats on the ceiling (a play on the Star Chamber and the German Ratskammer, which translates as 'council chamber'). Occupants report that spending any time in the room makes one want to leave and go have a good long bath.

His bedroom is spartan; containing little more than a narrow bed and a few battered cupboards. He apparently requires so little sleep and gets up so early that going to bed is merely an excuse to change his clothes ("He has a bedroom. He presumably sleeps" The New Discworld Companion). He is known to always be in his office at very late (or perhaps early) hours, apparently just coinciding with when someone wishes to see him and he wishes to see them. He is not often described as sleeping (exceptions are in Jingo and The Truth), although he has been unconscious several times.

He has one known relative (Lady Roberta "Bobbi" Meserole, his aunt) who may come from Genua and lives in Pseudopolis. She appears to share his forté for subtle politics. His father apparently died while Havelock was still young, and, according to his aunt, took things much less seriously than his son does.

Vetinari has no lust for power; though he freely admits that he is a tyrant like his predecessors, he has skilfully arranged matters to ensure that the public prefers his particular form of tyranny over any other.  The sole reason for his ruling the city is that he is fiercely loyal to it, although it is also at times been implied that he does it because it amuses him to do so, in the sense that he enjoys outwitting all the people who try to oppose him. He also has no exploitable vices, barring a strange fondness for candied jellyfish – mentioned in the early books but believed by some to be referring to a previous Patrician (see Bibliography). Compared to the previous Patricians of the city, Vetinari appears to be remarkably normal. The only exception to this is his pathological hatred of street mime artists, but this is largely seen as an acceptable quirk.

It was established in Guards!, Guards! that Vetinari can communicate with the palace rats. These rats have sentience because of the magic emanating from Unseen University. The rats are loyal to him because he provided them with military advice that, after a conflict with the snakes and scorpions that also inhabited the dungeons, allowed them to become the dominant vermin of the palace. During his imprisonment, as seen in the book, the rats have trouble with specific wording and Vetinari ends up with a book on lace-making in place of the one he desires. He takes the opportunity to learn lace construction anyway, on the principle that one never knows when such a thing may be useful.

Though he excels at the Discworld's equivalent of sudoku, Jikan no Muda (時間の無駄; literally, "Waste of Time" in Japanese), and can solve them after glancing at any grid for a few seconds, he finds them unsatisfying, as numbers are too easy to outwit. He enjoys crosswords far more, as one needs to comprehend how another person's mind works when actively trying to mislead. He has found great pleasure in the work of 'The Blind Letter Office' at the Post Office, helping to decipher the nigh-illegible gibberish that some of Ankh-Morpork's less educated citizenry address their letters with – for example working out casually that 'Duzbuns Hopsit pfarmarrsc' equals 'K. Whistler, Baker, 3 Pigsty Hill' (Does Buns Opposite the Pharmacy). The men employed for this job are successful in 'translating' five addresses out of every six, and view Vetinari's casual skill at it with something approaching awe. He is also very good at Thud, also known in the books by its Dwarvish name Hnaflbaflsniflwhifltafl (a reference to the Germanic-Scandinavian Tafl games, specifically Hnefatafl),  and plays it to find his own weaknesses unlike other people (Reacher Gilt, Going Postal) who play Thud to find the opponent's weaknesses. The New Discworld Companion also mentions his mastery of Stealth Chess, a game commonly played by assassins' guild students and alumni. In Soul Music, Vetinari is mentioned as preferring to read sheet music rather than listen to music, because the idea of it being performed by people, with all the sweat and saliva involved, strikes him as distasteful.

Lord Vetinari also has a strange clock in his waiting-room. While it does keep completely accurate time overall, it sometimes ticks and tocks out of sync (example: "tick, tock ... ticktocktick, tock ...") and occasionally misses a tick or tock altogether, which has the net effect of turning one's brain "into a sort of porridge". (Feet of Clay, Going Postal). In Feet of Clay Vimes observes that it must have cost him quite a lot of money.

It has been suggested that Vetinari may not be entirely human, though this is primarily because of his methods and personality, as opposed to any sort of physical proof (although in The Fifth Elephant, Lady Margolotta was surprised at his lack of aging).  Vetinari admits to being "drunk as a skunk" after a banquet at Unseen University, but continues to be startlingly lucid and eloquent, although Drumknott describes him as seeming "unusually talkative". The only discernible manifestation of his drunkenness: It takes him 15 seconds longer to solve the Ankh-Morpork Times daily crossword (Unseen Academicals).

Pets 
He did keep a pet, a sixteen-year-old wire-haired terrier called Wuffles. It is said that Wuffles is the only living creature Lord Vetinari actually cares about (unless Ankh-Morpork is considered a living creature, to be thought of as "Morporkia", a nod to "Britannia"). Wuffles has been described as very elderly in two books that take place many years apart. In the novel Making Money, it is shown that Wuffles has, at some recent point, died; reinforcing Vetinari's affection for the dog is the rumour that every week he makes a short (and via a different path) walk to Wuffles' small grave in the palace grounds, every time leaving a dog biscuit, though this may be entirely untrue, or may simply be done to add a layer of apparent human weakness to those seeking one.

As of Making Money he is now caring for another dog – 'Mr. Fusspot', the former pet of the late Topsy Lavish (née Turvy), Chairwoman of the Royal Bank and Mint. Thanks to an unusual will and Topsy's contempt for her in-laws; the rest of the Lavish family, Mr. Fusspot is formally and legally the current chairman. This leads to the debate whether this gives Vetinari control of the bank and mint, since Topsy's will states the person caring for Mr. Fusspot is also the executor of 'the chairman's' wishes for both concerns. The authority rested in Moist von Lipwig, the current Master of the Mint and temporary caretaker of Mr. Fusspot before Vetinari adopted/seized/confiscated the dog. There has been concern over the quality of Vetinari's care of the dog, though no one wishes to risk raising the issue with him.

Bibliography 
Lord Vetinari makes featured appearances in the Discworld novels Sourcery, Guards! Guards!, Moving Pictures, Reaper Man, Men at Arms, Feet of Clay, Jingo, Interesting Times, Soul Music, The Fifth Elephant, The Truth, The Last Hero, Going Postal, Thud!, Making Money, Unseen Academicals, Snuff and Raising Steam. Night Watch features him in his youth.

In The Colour of Magic, Rincewind is brought before "the Patrician" but it is not clear whether this Patrician is Vetinari or his predecessor, Mad Lord Snapcase, or possibly even Homicidal Lord Winder, although the description of this Patrician does not seem to tally with that of Vetinari, as the Patrician in question is, for example, described as obese – a trait his two predecessors did possess, but which he lacks. Pratchett has stated on Usenet that the Patrician in this case is indeed Vetinari, and that he simply lost weight due to the stress of his job. Upon being pressed, he admitted that the only real difference is that he has become a better writer since that time. It is also a reflection of the fact that the Discworld timeline is extremely uncertain.

Other media 
Vetinari was played by Crawford Logan in the 1992 BBC Radio 4 adaptation of Guards! Guards!. In television adaptations, the character has been portrayed by several actors: Jeremy Irons in TV movie adaptation of Colour of Magic, Charles Dance in the TV movie adaptation of Going Postal, and  Anna Chancellor in the television series The Watch.

Pratchett's own choice of actor to play Vetinari was Alan Rickman. 

VLC media player version 3.0 was given the codename Vetinari.

Reception
Vetinari was included in a list of the top ten Discworld characters by The Daily Telegraph in 2013; Tim Martin describes the character as "The kind of benign despot who would make Machiavelli faint with fear and envy". 

Matthew Sangster, in an article in Journal of the Fantastic in the Arts, describes the character's "fantastical  hypercompetence" as giving Pratchett a means to "skip over certain intricacies to imagine effects, affects, and consequences". Andrew Rayment, in a wide-ranging article on postmodernity, politics and fantasy in the journal Postmodern Studies, characterises Vetinari's decision to legalise the Guild of Thieves as a device for Pratchett to parody the fact that "official law is supported by the unwritten supplement that guarantees its functioning". He discusses Vetinari's attitude to journalistic truth and the freedom of the press in The Truth, stating that "he understands that part of the ideological role of newspapers is to reproduce already existing values about what the world is so that people can "'recognise' themselves in their world"", formulated in the form of news versus Vetinari's coinage "olds", and concluding that "Vetinari, as always, is right". Rayment goes on to highlight Vetinari's use of language, commenting on a scene in Unseen Academicals, that the character "change[s] the world with a flick (through) of a thesaurus". 

Gideon Haberkorn, in an article in Journal of the Fantastic in the Arts, describes Vetinari as a "realist" who is "no hero", and who provides a complementary viewpoint to Sam Vimes's cynicism and Carrot Ironfoundersson's idealism. In a review of Thud! for The Times, the novelist A. S. Byatt also compares the three characters, describing Vetinari's "chess-playing ordering of imperfect social beings" as being, as the series goes on, "ever more subtly" distinguished from Vimes's "sense of responsibility for his patch" and Carrot's "natural authority and courage".

See also 
 List of enlightened despots

References 

Source

External links 
 A Special Kind of Person, a web site concerning Lord Vetinari.
 Discworld & Pratchett Wiki

Discworld characters
Fictional assassins
Literary characters introduced in 1983
Fictional dictators
Fictional politicians
Male literary villains
Male characters in literature
Fictional lords and ladies